Much of the study of memes focuses on groups of memes called meme complexes, or memeplexes. Like the gene complexes found in biology, memeplexes are groups of memes that are often found present in the same individual. Applying the theory of Universal Darwinism, memeplexes exist because memes copy themselves more successfully when they are "teamed up".

Examples include:
 Belief Systems and Ideologies:Religions, philosophies, political alignments, worldviews.
 Organizations and Groups:Churches, businesses, political parties, clubs.
 Behavioral Patterns:Musical practices, ceremonies, marriages, festivities, hunting techniques, sports.

Compared to inherited gene complexes, memeplexes have comparatively less pressure to benefit the individuals expressing them in order to replicate. Because memes and memeplexes replicate virally (i.e., by horizontal transmission), they are not entirely dependent on the success of their hosts in order to succeed. Memes and memeplexes do not have to be useful or true, physically or mathematically, to replicate. For example, geocentrism was at one point an extremely successful idea (in terms of widespread acceptance), but is today not considered to be accurate, having been almost entirely replaced with more modern theories.

Philosopher Daniel C. Dennett, evolutionary biologist Richard Dawkins, and consciousness researcher Susan Blackmore (author of The Meme Machine) are proponents of memetics.

See also
 Metameme
 The Selfish Gene
 The Meme Machine
 Darwin's Dangerous Idea

References

 Susan Blackmore, "Meme, Myself And I"
 Daniel C. Dennett, "Ants, Terrorism, and the Awesome Power of Memes"; TED lecture, February, 2002
 Richard Dawkins, question and answer session at the University of California at Berkeley, March 8, 2008

Philosophy of mind

de:Memplex